Mass airflow may refer to:

 Mass Airflow Meter
 MAFless Tuning
 Airflow, as measured in units of mass per unit of time